Toni Hyvärinen (born July 14, 1988) is a Finnish professional ice hockey player who currently plays for KalPa of the Finnish Liiga.

In 2014, Hyvärinen moved from Jukurit to KalPa in the Finnish Liiga. Before the 2015–16 season, Hyvärinen signed with KooKoo of the Liiga. He signed a contract extension with KooKoo on 1 April 2016.

On 16 August 2018, Hyvärinen agreed to a profession try out with KalPa, which ended with him signing a contract for the 2018–19 season with them.

Career statistics

References

External links

1988 births
Living people
Finnish ice hockey right wingers
KalPa players
KooKoo players
Mikkelin Jukurit players
People from Kuopio
SaPKo players
Sportspeople from North Savo